This is a list of lighthouses in French Polynesia.

Lighthouses

See also
 Lists of lighthouses and lightvessels

References

External links
 

French Polynesia
French Polynesia-related lists
Transport in French Polynesia
Buildings and structures in French Polynesia